HG 84 was an Allied convoy of the HG (Homeward from Gibraltar) series during World War II.

Background
Following the U-boat Arm's defeat whilst attacking convoy HG 76, Befehlshaber der U-Boote (BdU), the U-boat high command, had temporarily discontinued further attacks against convoys on the Gibraltar route. This was overtaken by the shift in focus to Operation Drumbeat, the offensive against US shipping off the American east coast, and for six months the route was left undisturbed.
Seven outbound and seven homebound convoys, averaging 20 ships each, sailed without loss over a six-month period.
In June 1942 BdU determined that renewing the attack there would be profitable once more as it would achieve strategic surprise.

Forces involved
HG 84 comprised 20 ships homeward bound from Gibraltar, many in ballast, or carrying trade goods.
The convoy commodore was Captain Hubert Hudson, who had been the navigator on the Imperial Trans-Antarctic Expedition, in Pelayo, and the convoy was protected by an understrength escort group. The convoy was accompanied by a CAM ship, and the rescue ship Copeland.

Ranged against them was the wolfpack Endrass (named for the U-boat commander Engelbert Endrass) of nine U-boats (U-71, U-84, U-89, U-132, U-134, U-437, U-552, U-571, U-575).

Action
HG 84 sailed from Gibraltar on 9 June 1942, undetected by Axis patrols. and on 11 June was joined by three ships bound from Lisbon to the UK. However these ships had been shadowed by German aircraft, Fw 200 Condors based at Bordeaux, and these maintained contact while the Endrass boats moved to intercept. On 14 June U-552 (KL Erich Topp) made contact with the convoy, to be joined that evening by three others, U-89, U-132 and U-437.
However the escorts were able to pinpoint the shadowing U-boats by HF/DF and conducted an aggressive defence, attacking the U-boats as they attempted to close.

Stork and Gardenia attacked U-132, causing severe damage and forcing her to abandon the battle and leave the pack. Marigold and Convolvulus attacked U-89 and U-437 over a period of 31 hours. However U-552 was able to penetrate the screen and made two attacks. The first, just after midnight on 14/15 June, hit three ships Etrib, Pelayo and Slemdal, sinking all three. Commodore Hudson, on ‘’Pelayo’’, was among those lost.

During the next day, 15 June, five more boats arrived, but Walker's ships continued their aggressive defence, fiercely attacking all attempts by the U-boats to close. During this period U-552 and U-71 both suffered damage and had to withdraw. U-575 managed to close and fire, but her torpedoes missed and there was no damage.

On 16 June the convoy was joined by three more warships, the destroyer HMS Wild Swan and frigates HMS Rother and HMS Spey. The convoy also came within range of Coastal Command aircraft, and these were able to further suppress any U-boat attacks.

However the convoy was also in range of German aircraft, and during the day the convoy was attacked by Ju 88 dive-bombers. During this period, Wild Swan came under attack while investigating a group of Spanish trawlers which came close to the convoy. She, and the trawlers, were bombed and Wild Swan, with four of the Spanish trawlers, were sunk.

On 17 June, with the arrival of yet more Allied aircraft, BdU called off the attack. HG 84 arrived at Liverpool on 20 June without further loss.

Conclusion
Whilst the U-boat Arm had had some success, it was not the victory BdU had expected.

Three of the nine U-boats had been severely damaged, though only two, U-71 and U-552 had to return to base; U-132 was able to carry out repairs at sea and was able to continue her patrol.

HG 84 had lost five ships, yet 17 ships arrived safely. Walker was commended for his handling of the defence, and it was recognized he had been able to prevent further losses despite the disparity in numbers and to avert a major defeat.

Table

Notes

References
 Clay Blair : Hitler’s U-Boat War Vol I (The Hunters 1939–1942) (1996) 
 Arnold Hague The Allied Convoy System 1939–1945 (2000).  (Canada) .  (UK)
Stephen Roskill : The War at Sea 1939–1945   Vol II (1956). ISBN (none)
 Dan van  der Vat : The Atlantic Campaign (1988)

External links
HG 84 at convoyweb.org.uk
 HG 84 at warsailors.com
 HG 84 at U-boat.net

North Atlantic convoys of World War II
C